The Zone 5 of Milan (in Italian: Zona 5 di Milano) is one of the 9 administrative zones of Milan, Italy. It is the southernmost zone of the city.

Subdivision
The zone includes the following quarters: Basmetto, Cantalupa, Case Nuove, Chiaravalle, Chiesa Rossa, Conca Fallata, Fatima, Gratosoglio, Le Terrazze, Macconago, Missaglia, Morivione, Porta Lodovica, Porta Vigentina, Quintosole, Ronchetto delle Rane, San Gottardo, Selvanesco, Stadera, Torretta, Vaiano Valle and Vigentino.

Notable places
Bocconi University
Chiaravalle Abbey
Parco Agricolo del Ticinello

References

External links

 Zone 5 of Milan (municipal website)

Zones of Milan